Cletus Nzebunwa Aguwa was the first academic clinical pharmacist to be employed in Nigeria. He was also the first Professor of Clinical Pharmacy in Africa.

Early life and education 
He studied at St. Joseph's School, Eke Nguru (Now Central School, Eke Nguru) in Aboh Mbaise, Imo State for his primary education. He also studied at Holy Ghost College, Owerri, through the Eastern Nigerian Regional Scholarship (1960–1964). Thereafter, he proceeded to Trinity High School, Oguta for two years higher programme (1965–1966). He studied Pharmacy at Howard University College of Pharmacy, Washington D.C., USA and achieved a  Bachelor of Science in Pharmacy. In 1987, he became the first Professor of Clinical Science in Black Africa.

Appointments 
After his studies at Howard University, he was offered employment as Assistant Professor of Clinical Pharmacy at Howard for four years (1974–1978). He was then employed by the Faculty of Pharmaceutical Sciences, University of Nigeria, Nsukka.

Fellowships 
He was a fellow at Pharmaceutical Society of Nigeria (FPSN) and the West African Postgraduate College of Pharmacists (FPCPharm).

External links

References 

 

Living people
Year of birth missing (living people)
Place of birth missing (living people)
Nigerian pharmacists
Howard University alumni
Howard University faculty